Crocker County is a defunct county in the U.S. state of Iowa.  In 1870, the Iowa General Assembly created Crocker County from the northern part of Kossuth County. The county seat was located at Greenwood, Iowa. In December 1871, the Iowa Supreme Court declared the act creating this county a violation of the constitution, which in article eleven declares that no new county shall be created which contains less than 432 square miles. As Crocker County was smaller than the law allowed for, it ceased to exist from and after the rendition of that decision and the twelve townships in its territory reverted to Kossuth County.

See also
Bancroft County, Iowa, another county created out of the same area of Kossuth County.

References

Geography of Iowa
Former counties of Iowa
Kossuth County, Iowa
1870 establishments in Iowa
Populated places established in 1870
1871 disestablishments in Iowa